Kandukondain Kandukondain or Kandukonden Kandukonden is an Indian Tamil-language soap opera which aired on Zee Tamil. It stars Vishnu Unnikrishnan and Krishnapriya. It aired from 1 April 2019 to August 2020. The series premiered on 1 April 2020 and, due to the COVID-19 pandemic, it ended on 20 August 2020 with 265 episodes.

Plot
Vikram, who lost their parents in childhood and grown under his grandmother Anjana Devi. Vikram loves a girl, Preethi, and decides to marry her. But Vikram's aunt Chandrika and her daughter Kriba makes plan to separate them. Thus by a twist of fate, finally Vikram married Preethi.

Cast

Main
 Vishnu Unnikrishnan as Vikram
 Krishnapriya K Nair as Preethi / Thenmozhi

Supporting
 Seema as Anjana Devi: Vikram's grandmother
 Anu Sulash as Kriba: Vikram's cousin and Chandrika's daughter
 Amritha Varnan as Chandrika: Anjana's daughter and Vikram's aunt
 Premalatha as Vikram's parental aunt 
 Madhu Mohan as Vikram's parental uncle
 Anbazhagan as Ramki: Chandrika's husband
 Dhindukal Saravanan as Veerabhagu: House worker
 Madhumitha Illayaraja as Sreeja: Chandrika's relation

References

External links
 

Tamil-language television shows
Tamil-language romance television series
2019 Tamil-language television series debuts
Zee Tamil original programming
2020 Tamil-language television series endings
Television shows set in Tamil Nadu